Stella van Gils (born 4 August 1999) is a Dutch field hockey player who plays as a midfielder. She plays for club Pinoké and is part of the Netherlands women's national field hockey team. She made her debut for the national team on 30 May 2021. She was part of the national team at the 2021 Women's EuroHockey Nations Championship.

She was included in the Netherlands squad for the women's field hockey tournament at the 2020 Summer Olympics, held in July and August 2021. Though designated as a alternate player, due to rule changes caused by the COVID-19 pandemic she was eligible to compete in all matches (unlike previous tournaments, in which alternates could only compete after permanently replacing an injured player). Though the Netherlands earned the gold medal, she did not make an appearance and was therefore ineligible to receive a medal.

References

External links

1999 births
Living people
Dutch female field hockey players
Place of birth missing (living people)
Female field hockey midfielders
Field hockey players at the 2020 Summer Olympics
Olympic field hockey players of the Netherlands
20th-century Dutch women
21st-century Dutch women